At least two ships of the Brazilian Navy have borne the name Sergipe

 , a  launched in 1910 and stricken in 1944
  an  launched in 1944 as USS James C. Owen, acquired by Brazil in 1973 and stricken in 1995

Brazilian Navy ship names